Stephanos Tsimikalis (born 8 June 1985) is an alpine skier from Greece.  He competed for Greece at the 2010 Winter Olympics.  His best result was a 65th place in the giant slalom.

References

External links

1985 births
Living people
Greek male alpine skiers
Olympic alpine skiers of Greece
Alpine skiers at the 2010 Winter Olympics